Leonardo "Flaco" Jiménez (born March 11, 1939) is an American singer, songwriter and accordionist from San Antonio, Texas. He is known for playing Norteño, Tex Mex and Tejano music. Jiménez has been a solo performer and session musician, as well as a member of the Texas Tornados and Los Super Seven.

Over the course of his seven-decade career, he has received numerous awards and honors, including Lifetime Achievement Awards from the Grammys, Americana Music Awards, Tejano Music Awards, and Billboard magazine.

Early life
Jiménez, who is of Mexican descent, was born in San Antonio, Texas in 1939. He is descended from a line of musicians, including his father Santiago Jiménez Sr., and his grandfather Patricio Jiménez.

He began performing at the age of seven with his father, a pioneer of conjunto music, and began recording at age fifteen as a member of Los Caporales. Jiménez's first instrument was the bajo sexto, but he later adopted the accordion after being influenced by his father and zydeco musician Clifton Chenier.

He was given the nickname "Flaco" (which translates as "Skinny" into English), which was also his father's nickname.

Career 
Jiménez performed in the San Antonio area for several years and then began working with Doug Sahm in the 1960s. Sahm, better known as the founding member of the Sir Douglas Quintet, played with Jiménez for some time. Jiménez later went to New York City and worked with Dr. John, David Lindley, Peter Rowan, Ry Cooder and Bob Dylan. He appeared on Cooder's world music album Chicken Skin Music and was a guest musician on the Rolling Stones' Voodoo Lounge album. These appearances led to greater awareness of his music outside of America. After touring Europe with Cooder he returned to tour in America with his own band, and on a joint bill with Peter Rowan. Jiménez, Rowan and Wally Drogos were the original members of a band called the Free Mexican Airforce.

Jiménez appeared on the November 13, 1976 episode of NBC's Saturday Night with Cooder.

In 1988, he performed on the hit country single "Streets of Bakersfield" by Dwight Yoakam and Buck Owens. The song reached number 1 on the Billboard Hot Country Singles chart in 1988.

Jiménez won his first Grammy award in 1986 for his album Ay Te Dejo en San Antonio, whose title song was composed by his father. His third Grammy was for another song written by his father, "Soy de San Luis", recorded by the Tejano fusion group Texas Tornados with Augie Meyers, Doug Sahm and Freddy Fender.

Starting in 1998, he was a member of Los Super Seven, a supergroup that won a Grammy Award for their eponymous album.

Jiménez was one of the featured artists in the 1976 documentary film Chulas Fronteras, directed by Les Blank. He also appeared as a band member in the 2000 movie Picking Up the Pieces, with Woody Allen and Sharon Stone, and was also featured on the film's soundtrack. His music has been featured on the soundtrack for other movies, such as Y Tu Mamá También, El Infierno, The Border, Tin Cup, Chulas Fronteras, and Striptease.

He was one of the artists featured in archival footage in the 2013 documentary film This Ain't No Mouse Music about Arhoolie Records and its founder Chris Strachwitz.

The Hohner company collaborated with Jiménez to create the Flaco Jimenez Signature series of accordions.

Personal life

His brother, Santiago Jiménez Jr., is also an accomplished accordionist and has recorded extensively.

In March 2015, Jiménez suffered a broken hip and two rib fractures from two separate falls. By May of that year, he returned to performing and was one of the acts on closing night of the 34th annual Tejano Conjunto Festival in San Antonio.

Jiménez and his wife once owned a food truck in the San Antonio area, named Tacos Jimenez.

Discography

Studio albums
Una Sombra, 1972, D.L.B. Records, San Antonio, TX
El Papa Del Caminante, 1973, D.L.B. Records, San Antonio, TX
Mis Polkas Favoritas, 1973, D.L.B. Records, San Antonio, TX
Corridos Famosos, 1973, D.L.B. Records, San Antonio, TX
Clavelito Clavelito, 1973, D.L.B. Records, San Antonio, TX
La Otra Modesta, 1974, D.L.B. Records, San Antonio, TX
El Rey De Texas, 1975, D.L.B. Records, San Antonio, TX
A Mis Amigos Cariñosamente, 1976, D.L.B. Records, San Antonio, TX
El Principe Del Acordeón , 1977, D.L.B. Records, San Antonio, TX
Flaco Jiménez Y Su Conjunto, 1977, Arhoolie Records
Flaco ‘79, 1979, D.L.B. Records, San Antonio, TX
Mis 25 Años, 1980, D.L.B. Records, San Antonio, TX
El Sonido de San Antonio, 1980, Arhoolie
Polkas De Oro, 1983, D.L.B. Records, San Antonio, TX
Ay Te Dejo en San Antonio, 1986, Arhoolie
Flaco's Amigos, 1988, Arhoolie
Entre Humo y Botellas, 1989, Rounder Records
San Antonio Soul, 1991, Rounder Records
Partners, 1992, Warner Bros. Records
Flaco Jiménez, 1994, Arista Records
Buena Suerte, Señorita, 1996, Arista
Said and Done, 1998, Virgin Records
Arriba el Norte, 1998, Sound Records
Sleepytown, 2002, Back Porch Records
Squeeze Box King, 2003, Compadre Records
Ya Volvi De La Guerra, 2009, Fiesta Records
Flaco & Max: Legends & Legacies, 2014, Smithsonian Folkways Recordings

Live albums
One Night at Joey's (Live), 1999, Sony Records

Compilations and re-releases
El Rancho de la Ramalada, [release year unknown], Joey Records
Ay Te Dejo en San Antonio y Más!, 1990, Arhoolie
Un Mojado Sin Licencia and Other Hits From the 1960s, 1993, Arhoolie
Flaco's First! (with Los Caminantes), 1995, Arhoolie
15 Exitos, 1995, Joey Records
Best of Flaco Jiménez, 1999, Arhoolie
Ultimo Tornado, 2001, Warner Bros.
20 Golden Hits, 2001, Hacienda Records
Flaco's Favorites: 14 Fabulous Tracks, 2002, Fab14 Records
Contiene Exitos, Prieta Case Se Me Olvido Otra Vez, 2003, Discos Ranchito
Fiesta Del Rio, 2006, Fiesta Records
Melodias, 2010, Joey Records
Polkas y Mas..., 2010, Joey Records

Featured on multi-artist compilation albums
Tex-Mex Conjunto Classics, 1999, Arhoolie

Singles

Guest singles

Participations 
 2007 : "My Name Is Buddy" (Nonesuch Records), by Ry Cooder, with Paddy Moloney, Van Dyke Parks, Mike & Pete Seeger, Bobby King & Terry Evans, Jim Keltner, Jacky Terrasson, Jon Hassell
 1989 : Plays accordion on "New Pony" on the Orchestre Super Moth EP The World At Sixes And Sevens. Released on Rogue Records (12FMS 6–7).

Awards and honors
Between 1986 and 2015, Jiménez has won six Grammy Awards, including a Grammy Lifetime Achievement Award, plus an additional three nominations.

In 1999, Jiménez was awarded the Billboard Latin Music Lifetime Achievement Award.

In 2000, Jiménez won a Tejano Music Video of the Year award at the Tejano Music Awards for his song "De Bolon Pin Pon".

In 2001, both Flaco and his brother Santiago were included among the first group of recipients of the Texas Medal of Arts in the folk arts category.

Jiménez was awarded a Lifetime Achievement Award at the 31st Tejano Music Awards ceremony in 2011.

In 2012, he received a National Heritage Fellowship awarded by the National Endowment of the Arts, which is the United States government's highest honor in the folk and traditional arts.

In 2014, he received a Lifetime Achievement Award for Instrumentalist from the Americana Music Association. He received his plaque at the ceremony from longtime collaborator Ry Cooder, with whom he also performed at the event.

Jiménez was one of five artists to receive the inaugural Distinction in Arts honor from the City of San Antonio in 2015. Also in 2015, his collaborative album with Max Baca titled Flaco & Max: Legends & Legacies won an award in the Latin Album category at the 14th Annual Independent Music Awards.

In 2017, a photograph of Jiménez taken by Al Rendon in 1987 was added to the National Portrait Gallery of the Smithsonian Institution in Washington, D.C. Images in the Gallery "represent the numerous individuals who have made a significant impact on the history and culture of the United States".

In 2018, the Houston Chronicle listed him as number 19 of the Greatest 50 Texas Musicians of all time.

Jiménez received the Top of Texas Award from the Country Music Association of Texas in 2019. Earlier in the same year, he also received the History-Making Texas Award from the Texas State History Museum Foundation.

In 2020, Jiménez received the Chris Strachwitz Legacy Award from the Arhoolie Foundation.

In 2021, Jiménez's album Partners was selected as one of 25 works to be inducted into the National Recording Registry's class of 2020, with the registry calling Jiménez "a champion of traditional conjunto music and Tex-Mex culture who also is known for innovation and collaboration with a variety of artists."

Grammy awards

|-
! scope="row" | 1987
| Ay Te Dejo en San Antonio
| Best Mexican-American Performance
| 
| solo album
|-
! scope="row" | 1989
| Flaco's Amigos
| Best Mexican-American Performance
| 
| solo album
|-
! scope="row" | 1991
| "Soy de San Luis"
| Best Mexican-American Performance
| 
| song by the Texas Tornados
|-
! scope="row" | 1992
| Zone of our Own
| Best Country Performance by a Duo or Group with Vocal
| 
| album by the Texas Tornados
|-
! rowspan="2" | 1996
| Flaco Jiménez
| Best Mexican-American/Tejano Music Performance
| 
| solo album
|-
| "Cat Walk"
| Best Country Instrumental Performance
| 
| Lee Roy Parnell song, featuring Jiménez
|-
! rowspan="2" | 1999
| Los Super Seven
| Best Mexican-American Music Performance
| 
| album by Los Super Seven
|-
| Said and Done
| Best Tejano Music Performance
| 
| solo album
|-
! scope="row" | 2015
| himself
| Grammy Lifetime Achievement Award
| 
| 
|-

References

External links

Audio interview with Flaco Jiménez, May 28, 1986, University of Texas at San Antonio: Institute of Texan Cultures: Oral History Collections

Living people
1939 births
20th-century accordionists
21st-century accordionists
20th-century American male musicians
21st-century American male musicians
American accordionists
American country singer-songwriters
American male singer-songwriters
American musicians of Mexican descent
Musicians from San Antonio
Singer-songwriters from Texas
Country musicians from Texas
Tejano accordionists
Grammy Lifetime Achievement Award winners
National Heritage Fellowship winners
Texas Tornados members
Hispanic and Latino American musicians
Arhoolie Records artists
Arista Records artists
Rounder Records artists
Virgin Records artists